The 2007–08 Charlotte Bobcats season was the 18th season of NBA basketball in Charlotte in the National Basketball Association (NBA), and their fourth as the Charlotte Bobcats.

Charlotte finished 32–50 for the season and didn't qualify for the playoffs. Despite a frenzy of offseason moves, including trading for Jason Richardson and hiring new coach Sam Vincent, the Bobcats were unable to build on their successful 33–49 season in 2007. As a result, Vincent was relieved of his duties soon after the season ended, and replaced by veteran hall of fame coach Larry Brown three days later.

June to October: The offseason

2007 NBA draft

On May 22, the Bobcats were assigned the 8th pick in the 2007 NBA Draft Lottery after finishing 33–49 the previous season. With their lottery pick, Charlotte selected power forward Brandan Wright out of North Carolina. The Bobcats then traded Wright for Golden State Warriors swingman Jason Richardson and the draft rights to Golden State's second round pick Jermareo Davidson (Alabama, 36th overall). Later in the first round, Charlotte selected Jared Dudley out of Boston College with the 22nd pick.

Injuries and surgeries
The Bobcats lost the services of both Sean May and Adam Morrison prior to the season. After an exploratory procedure, it was determined that May needed season-ending microfracture surgery on his right knee. Morrison tore his anterior cruciate ligament (ACL) on October 20, 2007, in a preseason game against the Los Angeles Lakers.

Player departures
The Bobcats also waived team veteran Brevin Knight who was formerly the starting point guard but lost the job to Charlotte draft pick Raymond Felton. On December 14, 2007, the Bobcats said goodbye to original starting center Primož Brezec, and 2007 Second Team NBA All-Rookie selection Wálter Herrmann, trading them to the Detroit Pistons.

Staff changes
The Bobcats' most notable move in the off-season was the retirement of head coach Bernie Bickerstaff. Bickerstaff remained in the organization by becoming Executive Vice President of Basketball Operations. The Bobcats replaced him with Sam Vincent, former coach of the NBA Development League's Fort Worth Flyers. To complement Vincent, the organization hired assistants Dell Curry and Paul Mokeski to the coaching staff. Assistant coach John Outlaw was moved from his position to Player Programs/Director of Pro Player Personnel. The rest of the front office has been a key issue for the Bobcats during the 2007 offseason. Rod Higgins was hired on May 31, 2007, as general manager, assuming the same role he had with the Golden State Warriors. Phil Ford and Lee Rose were tapped to join Vincent's coaching staff on June 6, 2007. Buzz Peterson was hired from Coastal Carolina University, where he served as head basketball coach, to become director of player personnel on June 13, 2007.

Roster

Regular season

Standings

Record vs. opponents

Game log

|- bgcolor="ccffcc"
| 1 || November 2 || Milwaukee || 102–99 || Raymond Felton (26) || Emeka Okafor (14) || Raymond Felton (12) || Time Warner Cable Arena16,368 || 1–0
|- bgcolor="ccffcc"
| 2 || November 4 || @ Miami || 90–88 || Jason Richardson (29) || Emeka Okafor (13) || Raymond Felton (7) || American Airlines Arena19,600 || 2–0
|- bgcolor="#ffcccc"
| 3 || November 6 || Phoenix || 83–115 || Jared Dudley (16) || Jared Dudley (11) || Jeff McInnis (4) || Time Warner Cable Arena12,408 || 2–1
|- bgcolor="#ffcccc"
| 4 || November 7 || @ Philadelphia || 63–94 || Matt Carroll (16) || Emeka Okafor (11) || Derek Anderson (8) ||Wachovia Center9,317 || 2–2
|- bgcolor="ccffcc"
| 5 || November 9 || Indiana || 96–87 || Gerald Wallace (28) || Emeka Okafor (23) || Jeff McInnis (7) || Time Warner Cable Arena12,044 || 3–2
|- bgcolor="#ffcccc"
| 6 || November 11 || Houston || 82–85 || Matt Carroll (17) || Emeka Okafor (11) || Jeff McInnis (7) || Time Warner Cable Arena11,936 || 3–3
|- bgcolor="ccffcc"
| 7 || November 13 || Miami || 94–76 || Gerald Wallace (19) || Emeka Okafor (10)  || Raymond Felton (9) || Time Warner Cable Arena12,169 || 4–3
|- bgcolor="#ffcccc"
| 8 || November 14 || @ Atlanta || 109–117 || Jason Richardson, Gerald Wallace (27) || Emeka Okafor (8) || Jeff McInnis (6) || Philips Arena12,239 || 4–4
|- bgcolor="ccffcc"
| 9 || November 17 || Seattle || 100–84 || Gerald Wallace (27) || Emeka Okafor (10) || Raymond Felton (12) || Time Warner Cable Arena13,697 || 5–4
|- bgcolor="ccffcc"
| 10 || November 19 || Portland || 101–92|| Gerald Wallace (27) || Emeka Okafor (12) || Raymond Felton (10) || Time Warner Cable Arena 10,612|| 6–4
|- bgcolor="#ffcccc"
| 11 || November 21 || Washington || 111–114|| Raymond Felton (27) || Emeka Okafor (14) || Raymond Felton (12) || Time Warner Cable Arena 12,193|| 6–5
|- bgcolor="#ffcccc"
| 12 || November 23 || @ Orlando || 92–105||Wálter Herrmann (16) || Emeka Okafor (18) || Raymond Felton, Jeff McInnis (6) ||Amway Arena 17,136|| 6–6
|- bgcolor="#ffcccc"
| 13 || November 24 || Boston || 95–96||Jason Richardson (25) || Jared Dudley, Emeka Okafor,  Jason Richardson (9) || Raymond Felton (9) || Time Warner Cable Arena 19,201|| 6–7
|- bgcolor="#ffcccc"
| 14 || November 27 || @ Miami || 90–110 || Gerald Wallace (16) || Raymond Felton, Emeka Okafor (6) || Raymond Felton (7) || American Airlines Arena19,600 || 6–8
|-

|- bgcolor="#ffcccc"
| 15 || December 1 || @ Chicago || 95–111 || Jason Richardson (22) || Emeka Okafor (9) || Gerald Wallace (7) || United Center 21,729  || 6–9
|- bgcolor="#ffcccc"
| 16 || December 3 || @ Toronto || 79–98 || Gerald Wallace (19) || Jared Dudley (10) || Jeff McInnis (5) || Air Canada Centre 17,439 || 6–10
|- bgcolor="#ffcccc"
| 17 || December 5 || Chicago || 82–91 || Gerald Wallace (22) || Emeka Okafor (10) || Raymond Felton (6)  || Time Warner Cable Arena13,227   || 6–11
|- bgcolor="ccffcc"
| 18 || November 6 || Cleveland || 96–93 || Gerald Wallace (22) || Jason Richardson (8) || Jason Richardson (6) || Time Warner Cable Arena17,624 || 7–11
|- bgcolor="#ffcccc"
| 19 || December 9 || @ Detroit || 82–91 || Jason Richardson (15) || Derek Anderson (5) || Raymond Felton (6)  ||Palace of Auburn Hills22,076 || 7–12
|- bgcolor="ccffcc"
| 20 || December 12 || L.A. Clippers || 108–103 || Raymond Felton (26) || Emeka Okafor (16) || Jeff McInnis (8) || Time Warner Cable Arena10,751 || 8–12
|- bgcolor="#ffcccc"
| 21 || December 14 || Orlando || 82–91 || Raymond Felton (18) || Emeka Okafor (12) || Raymond Felton (6) || Time Warner Cable Arena19,109 || 8–13
|- bgcolor="#ffcccc"
| 22 || December 15 || @ Atlanta || 84–93 ||  Gerald Wallace (24) || Emeka Okafor (14) || Raymond Felton (5) || Philips Arena14,040  || 8–14
|- bgcolor="ccffcc"
| 23 || December 19 || Utah || 98–92 || Gerald Wallace (26)|| Emeka Okafor (9) || Raymond Felton (7) || Time Warner Cable Arena13,014|| 9–14
|- bgcolor="ccffcc"
| 24 || December 21 || New York || 105–95 ||  Gerald Wallace (27)|| Nazr Mohammed (14) || Raymond Felton (9) || Time Warner Cable Arena15,130|| 10–14
|- bgcolor="#ffcccc"
| 25 || December 22 || @ Milwaukee || 99–103 || Jason Richardson (30)|| Nazr Mohammed (11) || Raymond Felton (9) || Bradley Center15,796  || 10–15
|- bgcolor="#ffcccc"
| 26 || December 26 || Washington ||104–108|| Gerald Wallace (32) || Nazr Mohammed (12) || Gerald Wallace (6) || Time Warner Cable Arena14,705|| 10–16
|- bgcolor="#ffcccc"
| 27 || December 28 || New Orleans ||85–99|| Jason Richardson (25) || Nazr Mohammed (14) || Jeff McInnis (6) || Time Warner Cable Arena18,237|| 10–17
|- bgcolor="#ffcccc"
| 28 || December 29 || @ Orlando ||92–104|| Jason Richardson (34) || Emeka Okafor (9) || Gerald Wallace (7) || Amway Arena 17,519 || 10–18
|- bgcolor="ccffcc"
| 29 || December 31 || Indiana || 107–103 (OT) ||  Gerald Wallace (36) || Emeka Okafor (10) || Raymond Felton (6) || Time Warner Cable Arena12,223 || 11–18
|-

|- bgcolor="#ffcccc"
| 30 || January 2|| Chicago || 97–109 || Jason Richardson (28) || Gerald Wallace (11)  || Raymond Felton (9) || Time Warner Cable Arena11,568 || 11–19
|- bgcolor="#ffcccc"
| 31 || January 4|| @ New Jersey || 96–103 || Jason Richardson (33) || Emeka Okafor (13)  || Raymond Felton (8) || Izod Center 15,276 || 11–20
|- bgcolor="#ffcccc"
| 32 || January 6|| Milwaukee || 89–93 || Gerald Wallace (25) || Nazr Mohammed (12)  || Raymond Felton (10) || Time Warner Cable Arena10,884 || 11–21
|- bgcolor="ccffcc"
| 33 || January 8 || New Jersey || 115–99 || Jason Richardson (25)|| Gerald Wallace (11) || Raymond Felton (7)  || Time Warner Cable Arena11,913 || 12–21
|- bgcolor="ccffcc"
| 34 || January 9 || @ Boston || 95–83 || Jason Richardson (34) || Nazr Mohammed, Gerald Wallace (10) || Raymond Felton (8)  || TD Banknorth Garden18,624 || 13–21
|- bgcolor="#ffcccc"
| 35 || January 11|| @ Cleveland || 103–113 (OT) || Gerald Wallace (27) || Nazr Mohammed (15) || Raymond Felton (11) || Quicken Loans Arena20,562  || 13–22
|- bgcolor="#ffcccc"
| 36 || January 12 || Detroit || 100–103 (OT) || Gerald Wallace (26) || Emeka Okafor (15) || Jason Richardson (8) || Time Warner Cable Arena19,091 || 13–23
|- bgcolor="ccffcc"
| 37 || January 14 || Denver || 119–116 || Gerald Wallace (40)|| Emeka Okafor (13) || Raymond Felton (15) || Time Warner Cable Arena14,543 || 14–23
|- bgcolor="ccffcc"
| 38 || January 16 || Orlando || 99–93 || Gerald Wallace (36)|| Gerald Wallace (14)  || Jeff McInnis, Gerald Wallace (5) || Time Warner Cable Arena14,279 || 15–23
|- bgcolor="#ffcccc"
| 39 || January 18 || @ New Orleans || 84–112 || Emeka Okafor (13) || Nazr Mohammed (11) || Raymond Felton, Jeff McInnis (6) || New Orleans Arena 12,986 || 15–24
|- bgcolor="ccffcc"
| 40 || January 19 || Memphis || 105–87 || Jason Richardson (38) || Jason Richardson (14) || Raymond Felton (9) || Time Warner Cable Arena15,848 || 16–24
|- bgcolor="#ffcccc"
| 41 || January 21 || San Antonio || 86–95 || Emeka Okafor (10)|| Emeka Okafor (10) || Jeff McInnis (9) || Time Warner Cable Arena17,124  || 16–25
|- bgcolor="#ffcccc"
| 42 || January 23 || Dallas || 95–102 || Jason Richardson, Gerald Wallace (22)|| Gerald Wallace (11) || Raymond Felton (7) || Time Warner Cable Arena13,764 || 16–26
|- bgcolor="ccffcc"
| 43 || January 25|| @ Chicago || 90–77 || Emeka Okafor, Gerald Wallace (21) || Emeka Okafor (16) || Felton (8) ||United Center21,761 || 17–26
|- bgcolor="#ffcccc"
| 44 || January 26 || Philadelphia || 96–103 || Jason Richardson (35) || Emeka Okafor (16) || Gerald Wallace (10) || Time Warner Cable Arena18,074|| 17–27
|- bgcolor="ccffcc"
| 45 || January 28|| @ L.A. Clippers || 107–100 || Gerald Wallace (23) || Emeka Okafor (9) || Raymond Felton, Gerald Wallace (8) || Staples Center14,429 || 18–27
|- bgcolor="#ffcccc"
| 46 || January 30|| @ Sacramento || 91–105 || Gerald Wallace (25) || Emeka Okafor (15) || Raymond Felton (7) || ARCO Arena 12,627 || 18–28
|-

|- bgcolor="#ffcccc"
| 47 || February 1|| @ Golden State || 96–127 || Emeka Okafor (20) || Emeka Okafor (18) || Jared Dudley, Jeff McInnis, Jason Richardson, Gerald Wallace (4) || Oracle Arena 20,064 || 18–29
|- bgcolor="#ffcccc"
| 48 || February 2|| @ Denver || 101–117 || Jason Richardson (38) || Emeka Okafor (13) || Raymond Felton (9) || Pepsi Center 19,391 || 18–30
|- bgcolor="#ffcccc"
| 49 || February 4|| @ Phoenix || 104–118 || Jason Richardson (25) || Emeka Okafor (13) || Jeff McInnis (5) || US Airways Center 18,422 || 18–31
|- bgcolor="#ffcccc"
| 50 || February 8 || New Jersey || 90–104 || Gerald Wallace (21) || Emeka Okafor (17) || Nazr Mohammed, Jason Richardson (3) || Time Warner Cable Arena 16,319 || 18–32
|- bgcolor="#ffcccc"
| 51 || February 10 || @ Detroit || 87–113 || Jason Richardson (27) || Emeka Okafor (9) || Jeff McInnis, Jason Richardson (5) || Palace of Auburn Hills 22,076 || 18–33
|- bgcolor="#ffcccc"
| 52 || February 11|| L.A. Lakers || 97–106 || Raymond Felton (29) || Emeka Okafor (13) || Raymond Felton (8) || Time Warner Cable Arena 19,270 || 18–34
|- bgcolor="ccffcc"
| 53 || February 13 || Atlanta || 100–98 (OT) || Raymond Felton (22) || Emeka Okafor (21) || Raymond Felton (7) || Time Warner Cable Arena 11,213 || 19–34
|- bgcolor="#ffcccc"
| 54 || February 19 || @ San Antonio || 65–85 || Raymond Felton (19) || Emeka Okafor (10) || Raymond Felton, Jason Richardson (4) || AT&T Center 18,383 || 19–35
|- bgcolor="#ffcccc"
| 55 || February 22 || Sacramento || 115–116 || Jason Richardson (29) || Emeka Okafor (7) || Raymond Felton (10) || Time Warner Cable Arena 16,842 || 19–36
|- bgcolor="#ffcccc"
| 56 || February 23 || @ Washington || 95–110 || Jason Richardson (25) || Emeka Okafor (13) || Raymond Felton (9) || Verizon Center 20,173 || 19–37
|- bgcolor="#ffcccc"
| 57 || February 27 || @ New York || 89–113 || Emeka Okafor (18) || Emeka Okafor (14) || Raymond Felton (5) || Madison Square Garden 18,076 || 19–38
|- bgcolor="#ffcccc"
| 58 || February 29 || @ Boston || 100–108 || Jason Richardson (30) || Jared Dudley, Raymond Felton, Nazr Mohammed, Emeka Okafor (7) || Felton (10) || TD Banknorth Garden 18,624  || 19–39
|-

|- bgcolor="ccffcc"
| 59 || March 2|| Toronto ||110–98 || Jason Richardson (30) || Emeka Okafor (15) || Raymond Felton (8) || Time Warner Cable Arena 12,083 || 20–39
|- bgcolor="ccffcc"
| 60 || March 4|| @ Minnesota ||109–89 || Jason Richardson (25) || Emeka Okafor (11) || Raymond Felton (10) || Target Center 10,019 || 21–39
|- bgcolor="ccffcc"
| 61 || March 5|| Golden State || 118–109 || Jason Richardson (42) || Jared Dudley (18) || Raymond Felton (6) || Time Warner Cable Arena 13,747 || 22–39
|- bgcolor="ccffcc"
| 62 || March 7 || Atlanta || 108–93 || Raymond Felton (23) || Emeka Okafor (15) || Raymond Felton (11) || Time Warner Cable Arena 15,203 || 23–39
|- bgcolor="ccffcc"
| 63 || March 8 || @ Wizards || 100–97 || Jason Richardson (34) || Emeka Okafor (9) || Raymond Felton (12) || Verizon Center 20,173 || 24–39
|- bgcolor="#ffcccc"
| 64 || March 12|| @ Dallas || 93–118 || Raymond Felton (21) || Emeka Okafor (11) || Raymond Felton (6) || American Airlines Center 20,279 || 24–40
|- bgcolor="#ffcccc"
| 65 || March 14 || @ Houston || 80–89 || Jason Richardson (28)|| Nazr Mohammed, Emeka Okafor (9) || Jason Richardson (5) || Toyota Center 18,265 || 24–41
|- bgcolor="#ffcccc"
| 66 || March 16 || @ Cleveland || 91–98 || Jason Richardson (33)|| Nazr Mohammed, Emeka Okafor (12) || Raymond Felton (9) || Quicken Loans Arena 20,562 || 24–42
|- bgcolor="#ffcccc"
| 67 || March 17 || @ Memphis || 80–98 || Derek Anderson (17) || Nazr Mohammed, Emeka Okafor (7) || Earl Boykins (5) ||FedEx Forum 10,971 || 24–43
|- bgcolor="#ffcccc"
| 68 || March 19 || @ Indiana || 95–102 || Jason Richardson (20) || Jason Richardson (10) || Jason Richardson (8) ||Conseco Fieldhouse 10,813 || 24–44
|- bgcolor="ccffcc"
| 69 || March 22 || Miami || 94–82 || Gerald Wallace (26) || Nazr Mohammed (14) || Raymond Felton (10) || Time Warner Cable Arena 17,522 || 25–44
|- bgcolor="#ffcccc"
| 70 || March 25 || @ Utah || 106–128 || Jason Richardson (26) || Jared Dudley, Nazr Mohammed, Jason Richardson (5) || Raymond Felton (6) || EnergySolutions Arena 19,911  || 25–45
|- bgcolor="ccffcc"
| 71 || March 26 || @ L.A. Lakers || 108–95 || Jason Richardson (34) || Emeka Okafor (11) || Raymond Felton (10) || Staples Center 18,997 || 26–45
|- bgcolor="ccffcc"
| 72 || March 28 || @ Seattle || 96–93 || Jason Richardson (27) || Emeka Okafor (9) || Raymond Felton (6) || KeyArena 13,592 || 27–45
|- bgcolor="ccffcc"
| 73 || March 29 || @ Portland || 93–85 || Emeka Okafor (21) || Matt Carroll (7) || Raymond Felton (9) || Rose Garden 19,980 || 28–45
|- bgcolor="#ffcccc"
| 74 || March 31 || Toronto || 100–104 || Jason Richardson (26) || Emeka Okafor (12) || Raymond Felton (10) || Time Warner Cable Arena 12,188  || 28–46
|-

|- bgcolor="#ffcccc"
| 75 || April 2|| Cleveland ||114–118 || Jason Richardson (31) || Emeka Okafor (9) || Raymond Felton (9) || Time Warner Cable Arena 15,106 || 28–47
|- bgcolor="ccffcc"
| 76 || April 4|| @ Toronto ||105–100 || Jason Richardson (27) || Emeka Okafor (13) || Earl Boykins (8) || Air Canada Centre 19,800 || 29–47
|- bgcolor="#ffcccc"
| 77 || April 5|| Boston ||78–101 || Emeka Okafor (17) || Emeka Okafor (8) || Raymond Felton (10) || Time Warner Cable Arena 19,403 || 29–48
|- bgcolor="ccffcc"
| 78 || April 8|| Minnesota ||121–119 || Jason Richardson (36) || Nazr Mohammed (8) || Raymond Felton (11) || Time Warner Cable Arena 15,728 || 30–48
|- bgcolor="#ffcccc"
| 79 || April 9|| @ New York ||107–109 || Jason Richardson (25) || Jason Richardson (10) || Raymond Felton (8) || Madison Square Garden 18,943 || 30–49
|- bgcolor="ccffcc"
| 80 || April 12|| @ Indiana ||107–103 || Jason Richardson (26) || Emeka Okafor (18) || Raymond Felton (12) || Conseco Fieldhouse 14,265 || 31–49
|- bgcolor="#ffcccc"
| 81 || April 15|| @ New Jersey ||108–112 || Jason Richardson (31) || Emeka Okafor (15) || Raymond Felton (8) || Izod Center 14,532 || 31–50
|- bgcolor="ccffcc"
| 82 || April 16|| Philadelphia ||115–109 || Jason Richardson (29) || Emeka Okafor (9) || Raymond Felton (12) || Time Warner Cable Arena 17,043 || 32–50
|-

Player statistics

*Total for entire season including previous team(s)

Awards, records and milestones

Awards

Week/Month
 Jason Richardson was named the Eastern Conference Player of the Week for games played from March 3 through March 9.
 Jason Richardson was named the Eastern Conference Player of the Week for games played from March 24 through March 30.

All-Star

Season

Records
 Jason Richardson and Emeka Okafor set a single-season mark for games played by a Bobcat in a season with 82.
 Jason Richardson made 243 three-pointers, the fourth most in NBA history in a single season and a Bobcats franchise record.

Milestones
 Five-game winning streak, the longest in franchise history from March 2 through March 8.

Transactions
The Bobcats were involved in the following transactions during the 2007–08 season:

Trades

Free agents

Additions

Subtractions

See also
 2007–08 NBA season

References

Charlotte Bobcats seasons
2007–08 NBA season by team
Bob
Bob